Ben David Alford (born December 20, 1964) is an American actor, playwright, and author, best known for portraying Bucky Dawes on the television series Nashville.

Early life 
Alford was born and raised in Adams, Tennessee on his family's farm. His parents were Ben Robert Alford, a minister, and Sheridan (Durham). Alford attended Jo Byrns High School in nearby Cedar Hill, and then went for two years to Martin Methodist College in Pulaski. He next transferred to Austin Peay State University in Clarksville, Tennessee. At APSU he was originally a vocal performance major, but switched to the theatre program.

Acting 
When playwright Arthur Kopit was visiting APSU as an artist in residence, he noticed Alford's acting talent and arranged for him to audition for the Juilliard School drama program. Alford did so, and was accepted to the program.

After spending a few years in New York upon graduation from Juilliard, Alford moved back to Tennessee and founded Mockingbird Theatre in Nashville. He was artistic director of this theatre from 1994 to 2004, when he accepted the position of artistic director for Tennessee Repertory Theatre. He held this position until 2007, but spent an additional year at Tennessee Rep as an artist-in-residence.

In 2012 Alford joined the cast of the television series Nashville, portraying Bucky Dawes, the manager of country music star Rayna Jaymes (Connie Britton). Alford appeared on the show until it ended in 2018.

In 2017 Alford appeared in the Broadway revival of The Little Foxes with Laura Linney, Cynthia Nixon, Michael McKean, and Richard Thomas. Alford portrayed Mr. Marshall, as well as understudying McKean and Thomas.

Writing 
Alford has written two plays that are presented annually as part of the Bell Witch Fall Festival in his hometown of Adams. Spirit: The Authentic Story of the Bell Witch of Tennessee (2002) recounts the Bell Witch legend. Smoke: A Ballad of the Night Riders (2010) is set against the Black Patch Tobacco Wars.

Alford also co-authored the book Living the Dream: The Morning After Drama School with Brian Horner.

Personal life 
Alford has two sons from his first marriage. Since the fall of 2018, he has been a visiting artist in residence at Berry College in Mount Berry, Georgia.

Filmography

Film

Television

Video games

References

External links 

David Alford on IBDb
Bell Witch Fall Festival

1964 births
20th-century American male actors
21st-century American male actors
American male film actors
American male television actors
Juilliard School alumni
Living people